The first election to the State Council of Ceylon were held from 13 to 20 June 1931. This was the first election in a British colony which used universal adult franchise.

Background
In 1931 the Donoughmore Constitution replaced the Legislative Council of Ceylon with the State Council of Ceylon as the legislature of British Ceylon. The State Council was to consist of 58 members of which 50 would be elected by universal suffrage and the remaining 8 members appointed the Governor.

The old Legislative Council was dissolved on 17 April 1931 and candidate nominations took place on 4 May 1931. The Jaffna Youth Congress, an organisation that campaigned for Ceylon independence, called for a boycott of the election since the Donoughmore Constitution did not grant dominion status to Ceylon. Consequently, no nominations were received in four constituencies in the north of the country (Jaffna, Kankesanthurai, Kayts and Point Pedro). In addition, nine other constituencies only had a single nomination each and consequently the candidates were elected without a vote. Elections in the remaining 37 constituencies took place between 13 and 20 June 1931.

In 1934 by-elections were held for the four vacant seats in the north.

Elected members

References

Parliamentary elections in Sri Lanka
1931 elections in Asia
1931 in Ceylon
Election, 1931
June 1931 events
1931 elections in the British Empire